Henry Thomas Herbert Piaggio (2 June 1884–26 June 1967) was an English mathematician. Educated at the City of London School and St John's College, Cambridge, he was appointed lecturer in mathematics at the University of Nottingham in 1908 and then the first Professor of Mathematics in 1919. He was the author of "An Elementary Treatise on Differential Equations and their Applications".-

References

External links

. (MacTutor version of Three Sadleirian Professors)
new members - Margate Civic Society ("The Old and New Meet at the Rendezvous"), Winter 2007, Issue No. 345 Henry's father Francis ("Frank") Piaggio briefly operated a dancing academy in the Marine Palace, which he leased from 1895. The Marine Palace was built in 1884 and destroyed in the Great Storm of 1897, which devastated Margate.

1884 births
1967 deaths
Academics of the University of Nottingham
Mathematicians from London
Alumni of St John's College, Cambridge